In optical networking, a lightpath is a path between two nodes in an optical network between which light passes through unmodified.

Description 

When a lightpath can be established between source and destination node endpoints the connection is totally optical and avoids throttling by intermediate electronic conversions and processing.  Where a lightpath passes through an Optical add-drop multiplexer (OADM) is known as a cut-through lightpath. Where a lightpath is added or dropped at an OADM, it is known as an added/dropped lightpath.

Semi-lightpath 

Where endpoints are connected by a series of lightpaths with the intermediate nodes only changing the light wavelength at the junctions this may be referred to as a semi-lightpath.

See also 
 Wavelength switched optical network
 Multicast lightpaths
 Network Description Language

References 

Fiber-optic communications